Miguel Ángel Mercado Melgar (born August 30, 1975 in Santa Cruz de la Sierra), is a Bolivian retired football striker who spent most of his career playing for Bolívar.

Club career
Mercado emerged from the respected youth football academy Tahuichi. His first club at professional level was Bolívar, team for which he played for nearly twelve seasons with over 300 appearances. He also had short stints with San José, Wilstermann and the last club prior to his retirement, The Strongest. 

Among his achievements, he was named the league topscorer in the 2003 Clausura tournament with 18 goals.

International career
Between 1995 and 2004, Mercado earned a total of 12 caps with the national team and scored his only goal against Chile during Copa America 1995. He had also participated Copa America 2004, as starting right midfielder and represented his country in 2 FIFA World Cup qualification matches.

Honours

Individual
 Bolívar
 Liga de Fútbol Profesional Boliviano: 2003 (C) topscorer (18 goals)

Club
 Bolívar
 Liga de Fútbol Profesional Boliviano: 1996, 1997, 2002, 2004 (A), 2005 (AD)

References

External links

Bolívar topscorers
Base de Datos del Fútbol Argentino

1975 births
Living people
Sportspeople from Santa Cruz de la Sierra
Association football wingers
Bolivian footballers
Bolivia international footballers
1995 Copa América players
2004 Copa América players
Club Bolívar players
Club San José players
C.D. Jorge Wilstermann players
The Strongest players